Agustín Ormaechea (born 8 March 1991) is a Uruguayan rugby union player who plays as a scrum-half. He currently plays for Stade Montois at the Rugby Pro D2.

Ormaechea started his career in Uruguay playing for Carrasco Polo Club. In June 2013, he moved to France to play for Stade Montois.

International career
Ormaechea has earned 14 caps for Uruguay, since 2011, with 3 tries and 17 penalties scored. He is involved in the 2015 Rugby World Cup. In 2015, he played Rugby World Cup with Uruguay.

Ormaechea has also played sevens for Uruguay. In 2011, he played rugby sevens at the Pan American Games. In 2013, Ormaechea was part of Uruguay's squad for the 2013 Rugby World Cup Sevens.

Personal life
He is son of Uruguayan former rugby union footballer Diego Ormaechea, who is considered the greatest Uruguayan rugby union footballer of all time, and holds the record of being the oldest player ever to play in the Rugby World Cup in 1999.

References

External links
 

1991 births
Living people
Uruguayan people of Basque descent
Uruguayan rugby union players
Uruguay international rugby union players
Rugby union scrum-halves
Stade Montois players
Rugby union players from Montevideo
Uruguayan expatriate sportspeople in France
Uruguayan expatriate rugby union players
Expatriate rugby union players in France
Stade Niçois players